Mark Lee Simoneau (born January 16, 1977) is a former American college and professional football player who was a linebacker in the National Football League (NFL) for ten seasons.  He played college football for Kansas State University and was recognized as an All-American.  He was picked by the Atlanta Falcons in the third round of the 2000 NFL Draft, and played for the Falcons, Philadelphia Eagles, New Orleans Saints and Kansas City Chiefs of the NFL.

Early years
Simoneau was born in Phillipsburg, Kansas.  He played high school football at Smith Center High School in Smith Center, Kansas. He was a top 11 all-state (all classifications) selection at running back and linebacker for the Smith Center Redmen. He was also the 1995 Class 3A state shot put champion, and a former record holder, throwing over 60 feet as a senior.

College career
Simoneau attended Kansas State University, where he played for the Kansas State Wildcats football team from 1996 to 1999.  He was recognized as a consensus first-team All-American and the Big 12 Conference Defensive Player of the Year after the 1999 season.  He registered 400 tackles during his college career at Kansas State.

Simoneau was honored for his college career with induction into the College Football Hall of Fame in December 2012. He became only the second Kansas State player so recognized, the first being another former Wildcat linebacker, Gary Spani.

Professional career

Atlanta Falcons
Simoneau was drafted by the Atlanta Falcons in the third round of the 2000 NFL Draft.

Philadelphia Eagles
Simoneau was traded to the Philadelphia Eagles in March 2003, and signed a five-year contract with the team. Simoneau was acquired by the Philadelphia Eagles prior to the 2003 season, and led the team in tackles that year.  During the 2005 season, Simoneau kicked a PAT for his first NFL points. The last defensive player to kick an extra point had been Ted Thompson of the Houston Oilers on November 23, 1980.

New Orleans Saints
On August 28, 2006, Simoneau was traded to the New Orleans Saints along with a conditional fourth-round pick in the 2007 NFL Draft for Donté Stallworth.

He was placed on season-ending injured reserve on August 16, 2009 with a torn triceps muscle. He was released on March 4, 2010.

Kansas City Chiefs
Simoneau was signed by the Kansas City Chiefs on October 27, 2010. He was placed on injured reserve on November 17, and announced his retirement from the NFL on November 18.

NFL statistics

Coaching
Mark is now the Head Football Coach at Shawnee Mission East High School in Prairie Village, KS.

References

External links
Kansas City Chiefs bio
New Orleans Saints bio

1977 births
Living people
All-American college football players
American football linebackers
Atlanta Falcons players
College Football Hall of Fame inductees
Kansas City Chiefs players
Kansas State Wildcats football players
New Orleans Saints players
People from Phillipsburg, Kansas
People from Smith Center, Kansas
Philadelphia Eagles players
Players of American football from Kansas